Karel Svoboda was a male Czech international table tennis player.

He won a bronze medal at the 1931 World Table Tennis Championships in the men's doubles with Jindřich Lauterbach. He also won four consecutive team event silver medals from 1931 to 1935.

See also
 List of table tennis players
 List of World Table Tennis Championships medalists

References

Czech male table tennis players
World Table Tennis Championships medalists